Marquess of Fontes (in Portuguese Marquês de Fontes) was a Portuguese title of nobility, granted by a decree issued by King Afonso VI of Portugal on 2 January 1659, to D. Francisco de Sá e Menezes, 3rd Count of Penaguião.

On 24 June 1718, the 3rd Marquess of Fontes had his title changed, by King John V of Portugal, to Marquess of Abrantes, once he descended, by female line, from the prestigious Counts of Abrantes, an old line already extinct.

List of the Marquesses of Fontes (1659)
Francisco de Sá e Menezes (c.1640-1677), also 4th Count of Penaguião;
João Rodrigues de Sá Menezes (1674-1688), his son, also 6th Count of Penaguião;  
Rodrigo Anes de Sá Almeida e Menezes (1676-1733), his brother, also 7th Count of Penaguião. He became 1st Marquess of Abrantes in 1718.

See also
Marquess of Abrantes
List of Marquesses in Portugal

External links
Genealogy of the Marquesses of Fontes, in Portuguese

Bibliography
”Nobreza de Portugal e do Brasil" – Vol. II, page 614. Published by Zairol Lda., Lisbon 1989.

Fontes
1659 establishments in Portugal

pt:Marquês de Fontes